The seniors' division of the UAAP Season 76 volleyball tournaments opened December 1, 2013. Tournaments are hosted by Adamson University. Tournament games are held at the Filoil Flying V Arena in San Juan, the Mall of Asia Arena in Pasay and the Smart Araneta Coliseum in Quezon City.

Men's tournament

Elimination round

Team standings

Point system:
 3 points = win match in 3 or 4 sets
 2 points = win match in 5 sets
 1 point  = lose match in 5 sets
 0 point  = lose match in 3 or 4 sets

Match-up results

Game results 
Results to the right and top of the black cells are first round games, those to the left and below are second round games.

Bracket

Fourth–seed playoff 
Adamson and La Salle, which are tied at fourth place, played for the #4 seed, the last berth to the Final Four of the playoffs.

Elimination round games:
 January 15: La Salle (1–3) Adamson at the Filoil Flying V Arena (19–25, 18–25, 25–23, 15–25)
 February 12: La Salle (3–1) Adamson at the Filoil Flying V Arena (25–19, 25–21, 21–25, 25–18)

Semifinals

NU vs Adamson 
Elimination round games:
 December 11: NU (3–0) Adamson at the Filoil Flying V Arena (25–20, 25–19, 25–22)
 January 29: NU (3–1) Adamson at the Filoil Flying V Arena (25–21, 24–26, 25–15, 25–17)

Ateneo vs FEU 
Elimination round games:
 December 7: Ateneo (0–3) FEU at the Filoil Flying V Arena (26–28, 21–25, 26–28)
 January 18: Ateneo (3–1) FEU at the Filoil Flying V Arena (23–25, 26–24, 25–19, 25–21)

Finals 
Elimination round games:
 January 4: NU (3–2) Ateneo at the Filoil Flying V Arena (17–25, 25–21, 25–20, 18–25, 15–9)
 January 18: NU (0–3) Ateneo at the Filoil Flying V Arena (21–25, 24–26, 23–25)

Awards 

 Most Valuable Player (Season): Marck Jesus Espejo (Ateneo de Manila University)
 Most Valuable Player (Finals): Reuben Inaudito (National University)
 Rookie of the Year: Marck Jesus Espejo (Ateneo de Manila University)
 Best Scorer: Mark Gil Alfafara (University of Santo Tomas)
 Best Attacker: Mark Gil Alfafara (University of Santo Tomas)
 Best Blocker: Julius Evan Raymundo (University of the Philippines)
 Best Digger: Rence Melgar (Adamson University)
 Best Receiver: John Paul Pareja (Ateneo de Manila University)
 Best Server: Mark Gil Alfafara (University of Santo Tomas)
 Best Setter: Esmilzo Joner Polvorosa (Ateneo de Manila University)

Women's tournament

Season's team line-up

Elimination round

Team standings

Point system:
 3 points = win match in 3 or 4 sets
 2 points = win match in 5 sets
 1 point  = lose match in 5 sets
 0 point  = lose match in 3 or 4 sets

Match-up results

Game results 
Results to the right and top of the black cells are first round games, those to the left and below are second round games.

Bracket

Fourth–seed playoff 
Adamson and FEU, which are tied at fourth place, played for the #4 seed, the last berth to the first round of the playoffs.

Elimination round games:
 January 15: Adamson (2–3) FEU at the Filoil Flying V Arena (21–25, 20–25, 31–29, 25–19, 10–15)
 February 5: Adamson (3–1) FEU at the Filoil Flying V Arena (25–15, 17–25, 25–17, 25–23)

First round 

Elimination round games:
 December 15: Ateneo (3–0) Adamson at the Filoil Flying V Arena (25–23, 25–21, 25–18)
 February 1: Ateneo (3–2) Adamson at the Filoil Flying V Arena (25–22, 25–19, 16–25, 18–25, 15–13)

Semifinal 

Elimination round games:
 December 1: NU (3–0) Ateneo at the Filoil Flying V Arena (25–17, 25–22, 25–17)
 January 26: NU (3–1) Ateneo at the Filoil Flying V Arena (25–17, 25–17, 23–25, 25–19)

Finals 

Elimination round games:
 January 12: La Salle (3–0) Ateneo at the Mall of Asia Arena (25–16, 25–20, 25–16)
 January 19: La Salle (3–0) Ateneo at the Filoil Flying V Arena (25–14, 25–14, 25–19)
La Salle has the thrice-to-beat advantage after sweeping the elimination round.

Awards

 Most Valuable Player (Season): Alyssa Valdez (Ateneo De Manila University)
 Most Valuable Player (Finals): Alyssa Valdez (Ateneo De Manila University)
 Rookie of the Year: Alyja Daphne Santiago (National University)
 Best Scorer: Alyssa Valdez (Ateneo De Manila University)
 Best Attacker:  Aleona Denise Santiago (National University)
 Best Blocker: Katherine Adrielle Bersola (University of the Philippines)
 Best Digger:  Dennise Michelle Lazaro (Ateneo De Manila University)
 Best Receiver Dennise Michelle Lazaro (Ateneo De Manila University)
 Best Server: Alyssa Valdez (Ateneo de Manila University)
 Best Setter Kim Fajardo   (De La Salle University)

Boys' tournament

Elimination round

Team standings

Host team in boldface

Point system:
 3 points = win match in 3 or 4 sets
 2 points = win match in 5 sets
 1 point  = lose match in 5 sets
 0 point  = lose match in 3 or 4 sets

Match-up results

Awards

 Most Valuable Player: Edward Camposano (University of the East)
 Rookie of the Year: Armel Amuan (National University)
 Best Attacker: Edward Camposano (University of the East)
 Best Blocker: Kim Adriano (National University)
 Best Setter: Adrian Rafael Imperial (University of the East)
 Best Server: Ron Adrian Medalla (University of the East)
 Best Receiver: Richmond Crisostomo (Ateneo de Manila University)
 Best Libero: Manuel Sumanguid III (National University)

Girls' tournament

Elimination round

Team standings
Host team in boldface.

Point system:
 3 points = win match in 3 or 4 sets
 2 points = win match in 5 sets
 1 point  = lose match in 5 sets
 0 point  = lose match in 3 or 4 sets

Match-up results

Awards

 Most Valuable Player: Ennajie Laure (University of Santo Tomas)
 Rookie of the Year: Faith Nisperos (National University)
 Best Attacker: Ennajie Laure (University of Santo Tomas)
 Best Blocker: Pauline Gaston (University of Santo Tomas)
 Best Setter: Ejiya Laure (University of Santo Tomas)
 Best Server: Marites Pablo (National University)
 Best Receiver: Felicia Marie Cui (De La Salle University)
 Best Libero: Kristine Magallanes (National University)

See also
 UAAP Season 76

References

2012 in Philippine sport
2013 in Philippine sport
2012 in volleyball
2013 in volleyball
UAAP Season 76
UAAP volleyball tournaments